The 2018–19 Vegas Golden Knights season was the second season for the National Hockey League franchise that started playing in the 2017–18 season.

The Golden Knights bolstered their lineup during the offseason with the signing of Paul Stastny, as well as the acquisition former Montreal Canadiens captain Max Pacioretty. They also acquired goal-scoring forward Mark Stone from the Ottawa Senators at the 2019 NHL Trade Deadline, and subsequently signed him to an 8-year contract extension.

Prior to the season, the NHL suspended defenseman Nate Schmidt for 20 regular season games for violating the terms of the NHL/NHLPA Performance Enhancing Substances Program. On March 29, 2019, the Golden Knights clinched a playoff spot after the Arizona Coyotes' 3–2 overtime loss to the Colorado Avalanche.

Despite leading the series against the San Jose Sharks 3–1 in the First Round of the Stanley Cup playoffs, the Golden Knights were eliminated in seven games, after blowing a 3–0 3rd period lead in the deciding game following a controversial major penalty.

Standings

Schedule and results

Preseason
The preseason schedule was released on June 18, 2018.

Regular season
The regular season schedule was released on June 21, 2018.

Playoffs

The Golden Knights faced the San Jose Sharks in the First Round of the playoffs, and were defeated in seven games. They played against each other in the 2018 Stanley Cup playoffs, where the Golden Knights defeated the Sharks in the Second Round in six games.

Player statistics
Final

Skaters

Goaltenders

†Denotes player spent time with another team before joining the Golden Knights. Stats reflect time with the Golden Knights only.
‡Denotes player was traded mid-season. Stats reflect time with the Golden Knights only.
Bold/italics denotes franchise record.

Transactions
The Golden Knights have been involved in the following transactions during the 2018–19 season.

Trades

Free agents

Waivers

Contract terminations

Retirement

Signings

Draft picks

Below are the Vegas Golden Knights' selections at the 2018 NHL Entry Draft, which was held on June 22 and 23, 2018, at the American Airlines Center in Dallas, Texas.

Notes:
 The Vancouver Canucks' fourth-round pick went to the Vegas Golden Knights as the result of a trade on February 23, 2018, that sent Derick Brassard to Pittsburgh in exchange for Ryan Reaves and this pick.
 The Pittsburgh Penguins' fourth-round pick went to the Vegas Golden Knights as the result of a trade on June 21, 2017, that ensured Vegas would select Jason Garrison in the 2017 NHL Expansion Draft from Tampa Bay in exchange for Nikita Gusev, a second-round pick in 2017 and this pick.
 The Carolina Hurricanes' fifth-round pick went to the Vegas Golden Knights as the result of a trade on July 4, 2017, that sent Marcus Kruger to Carolina in exchange for this pick.
 The Toronto Maple Leafs' sixth-round pick went to the Vegas Golden Knights as the result of a trade on October 6, 2017, that sent Calvin Pickard to Toronto in exchange for Tobias Lindberg and this pick.
 The Pittsburgh Penguins' seventh-round pick went to the Vegas Golden Knights as the result of a trade on June 23, 2018, that sent a seventh-round pick in 2019 to Pittsburgh in exchange for this pick.

References

Vegas Golden Knights seasons
Vegas Golden Knights
2018 in sports in Nevada
2019 in sports in Nevada
Events in Paradise, Nevada